Argyroploce noricana is a moth of the family Tortricidae. It was described by Gottlieb August Wilhelm Herrich-Schäffer in 1851. It is found from Scandinavia and northern Russia south to Italy and from France east to Bulgaria and Romania.

The wingspan is 14–16 mm. Adults are on wing from June to August.

The larvae feed on Dryas octopetala.

References

Moths described in 1851
Tortricidae of Europe
Olethreutini